Grand Hotel Cirta or Hotel Cirta is a hotel in Constantine, Algeria, located in a white colonial building at 1 Avenue Rahmani Achour, on the edge of Place des Martyrs. The hotel is the property of the Societe de l'Hotel Cirta, owned by Mohand Tiar, an Algerian businessman and philanthropist.

Architecture
The hotel has 76 rooms, including 30 double rooms, 33 single rooms, 1 triple room and 4 suites and 1 apartment room. Lonely Planet describes it as a "grand old hotel" and "another remnant of the colonial era". In 1935 one publication described the hotel as being "as fine a hotel as anyone would care to stop at, excepting that we do not have a private bath". Another said in 1972, "The grandeur of its mosque-like domed lobby, with its light blue tiles and hanging brass lanterns, may be fading somewhat in these post-colonial days of the Peoples' Democratic Republic of Algeria." The hotel contains a cinema.

References

External links
 

Hotels in Algeria
Economy of Constantine, Algeria
Buildings and structures in Constantine, Algeria
Hotels established in 1912
Hotel buildings completed in 1912